The Women's Downhill B1 was one of the events held in Alpine skiing at the 1988 Winter Paralympics in Innsbruck.

There were 6 competitors in the final.

Spain's Susana Herrera set a time of 1:42.41, taking the gold medal. Since only three skiers finished the race, all three won a medal.

Results

Final

References 

Downhill
Para